Attorney General Butler may refer to:

Benjamin Franklin Butler (lawyer) (1795–1858), Attorney General of the United States
Edward Butler (Australian politician) (1823–1879), Attorney General of New South Wales

See also
General Butler (disambiguation)